Herman II, Lord of Lippe (1175 – 25 December 1229) was a ruling Lord of Lippe.

Life 
Herman II was born in Lippe (now called Lippstadt), the eldest son of Lord Bernhard II and his wife, Heilwig, a daughter of Count Otto I Heilwig of Are-Hostaden.

He was co-regent with his father, and succeeded him in 1196 as ruler of the House of Lippe.  He was less belligerent than his father and brother, and often tried  to act as intermediary when his neighbours had a dispute.  
In the dispute over the German throne in 1198, Herman supported the Guelph side.  He switched sides to support Emperor Frederick II in 1214.

In 1217 or 1218, Herman became administrator in Utrecht, representing his brother Otto II, who was Bishop of Utrecht.  He promoted the cities and gained the post of Vogt of the Monasteries Clarholz and Herzebrock.  His main opponent during this period was Engelbert II of Berg, who was Archbishop of Cologne.  Earlier in his career, Herman had supported Engelbert.

In 1227, Herman II fought in the Battle of Bornhöved against Denmark.  He supported his brother, Archbishop Gerhard II of Bremen against the farmers in Stedingen and fell in battle against them. This brought about a strong reaction from Gerhard, resulting in the Stedinger Crusade.

Marriage and issue 
Herman was married to Oda, a daughter of Count Simon I of Tecklenburg and Countess Oda of Berg-Altena.  Among their seven children were:
 Bernard III ( – ), Lord of Lippe
 Simon I ( – 6 June 1277), Bishop of Paderborn
 Otto II ( – 21 June 1259), Bishop of Münster
 Heilwig ( – ), married to Count Adolph IV of Holstein-Kiel
 Ethelind ( – 17 September 1262), married Count Conrad I of Rietberg
 Gertrude ( – 30 September 1244), married Count Louis of Ravensburg-Biesterfeld

References

Lords of Lippe
Lords of Rheda
1175 births
1229 deaths
12th-century German nobility
13th-century German nobility